Cloud of Sparrows (2002) is the first historic novel by author Takashi Matsuoka featuring the struggle of Genji, the young Great Lord of Akaoka, in the year 1861.  This is only six years after Japan opened to the West and features three American missionaries who become involved with Genji, notably, Emily who hopes to find solace in Japan and build a church and Matthew, a product of the American West who seeks revenge.  As Genji struggles to bring his clan to victory during turbulent times, he enlists the help of his geisha lover, his master swordsman uncle all while fighting enemy clans and ninjas.  This book is praised for its cultural and historical accuracy.  The second book in the series features the Cloud of Sparrows castle and the missionary Emily, titled Autumn Bridge (2004).

2002 American novels
Historical novels
Fiction set in the 1860s